Circus of Books is a 2019 American documentary film directed by Rachel Mason, written by Rachel Mason and Kathryn Robson and starring Karen Mason, Barry Mason and Rachel Mason. The premise revolves around Circus of Books, a bookstore and gay pornography shop in West Hollywood, California, and in the Silver Lake neighborhood of Los Angeles.

The film premiered at the 2019 Tribeca Film Festival, and was released on Netflix in the United States on April 22, 2020.

Cast
 Karen Mason
 Barry Mason
 Rachel Mason
 Josh Mason
 Micah Mason
 Alexei Romanoff
 Billy Miller
 Don Norman
 Freddie Bercovitz
 Paulo Morillo
 Ellen Winer
 Larry Flynt
 David Gregory
 Fernando Aguilar
 Alaska Thunderfuck
 Jeff Stryker

Release 
The film premiered at the 2019 Tribeca Film Festival. It went on to show at several film festivals, including the Frameline Film Festival, Outfest, the Hamptons International Film Festival, and the BFI London Film Festival. At the 2019 Sidewalk Film Festival, the film won the Audience Award for Best Documentary Feature.

On April 22, 2020, the film was released on Netflix.

Reception 
The website's critics consensus reads: "Like the cheekily named store at this documentary's center, Circus of Books proves there are countless stories below the surface if we're only willing to look." The Guardian Peter Bradshaw rated the film 4 out of 5 stars.

Circus of Books was nominated for the 2021 GLAAD Media Award for Outstanding Documentary.

References

External links

 
 

2019 films
2019 documentary films
2019 LGBT-related films
American documentary films
American LGBT-related films
Documentary films about gay male pornography
Documentary films about Los Angeles
Netflix original documentary films
2010s English-language films
2010s American films